Campus Ladies is an American sitcom that premiered on Oxygen on January 8, 2006. It stars Christen Sussin and Carrie Aizley as two 40-something women who decide to go enroll at the fictional University of the Midwest. The humor comes from the various situations in which the "ladies" get involved while trying to fit in with their much younger friends and classmates.

Premise
The shopping trip of recent widow Joan Beamin and married Barri Martin, lifelong friends and both apparently childless, is cut short when Barri wastes a drink on her skirt. When they go to Barri's house for her to change, they find her husband Roger having an affair in their bedroom. The ladies end up in a bar and observe a group of students from the local university, and ultimately decide to enroll.

Once at UMW, the ladies meet Drew and Abdul, two of their classmates who will be living in the room next to them. Drew is tall and blond and believes himself to be a ladies' man, but in actuality, is far from that. Abdul is an Iranian young man who refers to everyone as "Mister" and "Miss". The ladies also meet their roommate, a young woman named Paige, who is, at first, not thrilled to be sharing a room with Joan and Barri. Also, Guy is the dorm's resident advisor.

From then on, the ladies embark on the adventures of college life, complete with one-night stands, sexual experimentation, research papers, and football games.

The majority of the show's dialogue is improvised, as the most of the actors are members or alumni of the Groundlings comedy troupe.

Cast

Main
 Christen Sussin as Barri Martin
 Carrie Aizley as Joan Beamin
 Derek Carter as Drew Penniger
 Jonah Hill as Guy Ferguson (season one)
 Miranda Kent as Paige Hollister
 Amir Talai as Abdul

Recurring
 Danielle Weeks as Phoebe
 Natalie Garza as Faith and Nicole Garza as Harley
 Jessica Radloff as Marni

Guest and cameo appearances
 Jane Kaczmarek appeared in the pilot as Joan and Barri's friend.
 Will Forte and Anthony Anderson appeared in "Night of the Condom" and "My First Orgasm" as Stuart and James, two graduate students with whom Joan and Barri developed on-again-off-again relationships.
 Maya Rudolph appeared in "All Nighter" as Teresa Winslow Fabré, the ladies' tough professor
 Dan Castellaneta appeared in "No Means No" and "Safety Bathroom" as the dean of the university.
 Paul Reubens appeared in "Drama Class" as the drama instructor.
 Fred Willard appeared in "Spring Break" as a doctor.
 Jason Alexander appeared as a geography professor in "A Very Special Episode" (Dec. 5, 2006; he also directed this episode)
 Mo'Nique appeared as a professor in the "Black Sorority" episode.
 Sean Hayes appeared in "Foreign Policy" and "A Very Special Episode".
 Janeane Garofalo appeared in "The Blind Leading the Blonde" (Dec 19, 2006).
 Di Quon appeared in "Foreign Policy" as Yun, the ladies' tutor
 Brian Drolet appeared in "My First Orgasm" as College Student.

Recasts
 Both Jerry Lambert (in the pilot) and Ian Gomez (in "Spring Break") have appeared as Roger Martin, Barri's ex-husband. Kevin Nealon also shot scenes as Roger Martin that were to be used in the pilot, but were ultimately scrapped.

Cancellation
The show was confirmed cancelled by Amir Talai on a MySpace fan page.
The comment said:
"I regret to inform you that Campus Ladies has been cancelled. Thank you from the bottom of our hearts for your support. The show was the most fun I've ever had on a set, and I made some life-long friends there. Be on the lookout for the DVDs at some point.
Lots of love to all the shows fans."

Episodes

Season 1 (2006)

Season 2 (2006–07)
 "The Dare" (December 5, 2006)
 "A Very Special Episode" (December 5, 2006)
 "Webcam" (December 12, 2006)
 "The Blind Leading the Blonde" (December 19, 2006)
 "Black Sorority" (January 2, 2007)
 "Psych 101" (January 9, 2007)
 "Safety First" (January 16, 2007)
 "The Last Supper" (January 23, 2007)
 "We Are Family" (January 30, 2007)
 "Foreign Exchange" (February 6, 2007)

External links
Promo

2006 American television series debuts
2007 American television series endings
2000s American college television series
2000s American sex comedy television series
2000s American sitcoms
Oxygen (TV channel) original programming